, better known as , is a Japanese entertainer and radio personality who is represented by the talent agency, Sun Music.

Shirosaki worked at a host club.

Biography
Shirosaki served as a host of host club Club Ai for five years in Kabukichō, Shinjuku, and appeared on numerous television programs as a charismatic host. He made a name for himself in Japan as a celebrity host and said that at the time, his annual income exceeded 100 million yen.

In early 2005, he suddenly retired as a host and became a tarento the same year. Shirosaki was later contracted by Sun Music and worked mainly on variety show.

On June 21, 2006, he made his singing debut with "Bulldog", together with Masatoshi Sakai, and produced by Four Leaves.

Filmography

TV series

Dramas

Films

Direct-to-video

Stage performances

Radio series

Advertisements

References

External links
Official profile 

Japanese entertainers
Japanese radio personalities
1977 births
Living people
People from Itabashi